The MAMA Award for Worldwide Icon of the Year is a daesang (or grand prize) award presented annually by CJ E&M (Mnet). It was first awarded at the 20th Mnet Asian Music Awards ceremony held in 2018 and is a 100% fan-voted accolade.

Winners and nominees

Artists with multiple wins 
Throughout the history of MAMA Awards, only one artist has received the award more than once. BTS is currently the only recipient of this award.

5 awards
 BTS

Artists with multiple nominations 
Note: The nominees are Worldwide Fans' Choice Top 10 winners

5 nominations
 BTS
 Seventeen

4 nominations
 Blackpink
 Got7
 Twice
 Tomorrow X Together

3 nominations
 Treasure

2 nominations
 Mamamoo
 NCT 127
 Monsta X
 Ateez
 NCT Dream
 Enhypen
 Stray Kids

Notes

References

External links 

 Mnet Asian Music Awards official website

Worldwide Icon